Margaret Higgins may refer to:

 Margaret Higgins (murderer) (1843–1884), Irish serial killer
 Margaret Louise Higgins (known as Margaret Sanger; 1879–1966), American birth control activist